Cartuna is a Brooklyn-based animation production company that has made animated TV Shows for Syfy, Comedy Central and Facebook Watch. The company has producers, all of which have their own unique style.

History 
The company was founded in May 2015 in Bushwick, Brooklyn by James Belfer and Adam Belfer, viewing a perceived gap in the market for adult animation for digital and mobile audiences that they could fill. The Studio would produce the animation for the documentary film Nuts! in 2016, which won a Special Jury prize at the Sundance Film Festival. Later, the company would expand into making animated series releasing the web series like Dogs in A Park. In 2018, the company would increase production making the shows Human Kind Of and Liverspots and Astronots for Facebook Watch and Alan & Elle for IFC. In 2019, the company would release its first feature, titled Film Tux and Fanny. More recently, Cartuna partnered with Syfy to produce shows for its TZGZ block, specifically Science! in 2019 and Magical Girl Friendship Squad in 2020, along with the associated pilot series released the same year, Magical Girl Friendship Squad: Origins. Cartuna would also be responsible for work on Loafy, a series of animated shorts which aired on Comedy Central.

In September 2020, in an interview, Kelsey Stephanides, creator of Magical Girl Friendship Squad, argued that her show would have been "totally different" if another studio produced it. Cartuna worked with over 100 artists on the series. The animation was done on Adobe Animate, the backgrounds done in Adobe Photoshop, and character design done in both. Five years earlier, while in school at New York University, studying Media, Culture and Communications, Stephanides, an avid fan of the magical girl genre, came up with the idea for the show and was convinced by Belfer, a professor at the same school, to pitch it to Cartuna. After that, production on the series began, meant to be a "short-form pitch to networks," and it was pitched around for years until 2019, when SYFY picked it up, wanting to reboot it, polish it more, and have longer episodes, leading to the creation of the main show, Magical Girl Friendship Squad, itself.

Also in September 2020, Cartuna picked a new Senior-Vice President named Mike Flavin, who formerly worked at Gunpowder & Sky, an independent studio owned by WarnerMedia. Belfer was quoted as saying that they were "doubling down" on development, adding that animation is a medium, rather than a genre, and noted Flavin's experience "from live-action development," allowing them to expand adult animation in the future.

In November 2020 it was announced that Cartuna would be collaborating with Doing Things Media on a IGTV series titled Office Fire.

Films

Television

Music videos

Notes

References 

2015 establishments in New York City
Companies based in Brooklyn
American animation studios
Mass media companies established in 2015
Entertainment companies based in New York City
Cartuna
Television production companies of the United States
Adult animation studios